Kevin Bain (born 19 September 1972) is a Scottish former footballer, who played for Dundee, Rotherham United, Stirling Albion, Brechin, Peterhead and East Fife.

Bain represented the Scotland national under-21 football team.

References

External links 

1972 births
Living people
Footballers from Kirkcaldy
Association football central defenders
Scottish footballers
Dundee F.C. players
Rotherham United F.C. players
Stirling Albion F.C. players
Brechin City F.C. players
Peterhead F.C. players
East Fife F.C. players
Scottish Football League players
English Football League players
Scotland under-21 international footballers
Scotland youth international footballers